Cullins is a surname. Notable people with the surname include:

 Paris Cullins, American comics artist
 Peter K. Cullins (1928–2012), American admiral
 Ryan Cullins, Canadian politician

See also
 Collins (surname)